Anolis woodi, Wood's anole, is a species of lizard in the family Dactyloidae. The species is found in Panama and Costa Rica.

References

Anoles
Reptiles described in 1940
Reptiles of Panama
Reptiles of Costa Rica
Taxa named by Emmett Reid Dunn